Derrick Griffin (born September 3, 1993) is an American professional basketball player who last played for the Texas Legends of the NBA G League. He played basketball and football for Texas Southern.

College football career
Griffin was third ranked wide receiver in the nation in 2013, and signed with Miami but did not play due to academics. As a redshirt freshman wide receiver, he led the SWAC in touchdown catches with 11 and was named to the 2015 All-SWAC Football Team.

College basketball career
Griffin averaged 13.5 points-per-game, 11.3 rebounds-per-game, and 2.3 blocks per game as the only SWAC player to average a double-double. He set the conference single-season record for consecutive double-doubles with 12 and most in a single season with 17. Following the season he was named SWAC Player of the Year.

Professional football career
Griffin was dismissed from the football team in 2016. Several weeks later, he ended his college basketball career by signing with an agent to prepare for the NFL Draft. He went undrafted, but signed with the Minnesota Vikings although he was cut before appearing in a game.

Professional basketball career

South Bay Lakers (2018–2019)
On September 12, 2018, Griffin signed with the South Bay Lakers of the NBA G League.

Stockton Kings (2019–2020)
For the 2019–20 season, Griffin moved to the Stockton Kings. Griffin averaged 3.4 points and 3.6 rebounds per game.

On October 23, 2021, Griffin was selected 50th overall by the Birmingham Squadron in the 2021 NBA G League draft. However, he was waived by the Squadron on November 3.

Salt Lake City Stars (2021–2022)
On December 31, 2021, Griffin was acquired via available player pool by the Salt Lake City Stars. He was then later waived on January 12, 2022.

Texas Legends (2022)
On February 5, 2022, Griffin was acquired via available player pool by the Texas Legends. He was then later waived on February 18, 2022.

References

External links
NBA Draft.net
NBA G-League stats at Basketball-Reference.com

1993 births
Living people
American football wide receivers
American men's basketball players
Basketball players from Houston
Players of American football from Texas
Power forwards (basketball)
Salt Lake City Stars players
South Bay Lakers players
Stockton Kings players
Texas Southern Tigers football players
Texas Southern Tigers men's basketball players